Got No Bread, No Milk, No Money, But We Sure Got a Lot of Love is the debut album by the country singer-songwriter James Talley. It was recorded in 1973 at Hound's Ear Studios in Nashville, Tennessee.

Critical reception 
Reviewing in Christgau's Record Guide: Rock Albums of the Seventies (1981), Robert Christgau wrote: "The most attractive thing about this homespun Western-swing masterpiece—infusing both its sure, unassuming intelligence and its plain and lovely songs—is a mildness reminiscent of the first recorded string bands. Talley's careful conception and production both work to revive a playing-pretty-for-our-friends feel that most folkies would give up their rent-controlled apartments for. Despite its intense rootedness, it's neither defensive nor preachy—just lays down a way of life for all to hear."

Track listing
"W.Lee O'Daniel and the Light Crust Doughboys" (Talley) – 2:47
"Got No Bread, No Milk, No Money, But We Sure Got a Lot of Love" (Talley) – 2:11
"Red River Memory" (Talley) – 3:25
"Give Him Another Bottle" (Talley) – 2:00
"Calico Gypsy" (Talley) – 2:53
"To Get Back Home" (Talley) – 2:20
"Big Taters in the Sandy Land" (Johnny Gimble) – 1:36
"No Opener Needed" (Talley) – 3:11
"Blue-Eyed Ruth and My Sunday Suit" (Talley) – 1:54
"Mehan, Oklahoma" (Talley) – 2:41
"Daddy's Song" (Talley) – 1:34
"Take Me to the Country" (Talley) – 3:53
"Red River Reprise" (Talley) – 2:13

Personnel

James Talley – Acoustic Guitar, Lead Vocals
Doyle Grisham – Steel Guitar, Acoustic Guitar, Electric Guitar, Dobro
Jerry McKuen – Electric Guitar, Acoustic Guitar, Mandolin
Johnny Gimble – Fiddle, Mandolin
Rick Durrett – Organ, Piano, Accordion
Steve Hostak – Electric Guitar
Steve Mendell – Bass
Wayne Secrest – Bass
Lisa Silver – Fiddle
Ralph Childs – Tuba
Karl Himmel – Drums
Gregg Thomas – Drums
Dave Poe – Clarinet
Tommy Smith – Trumpet
Michael Martin – Spoons
Johnny Bell – Background Vocals
Dave Gillon – Background Vocals
Tony Lyons – Background Vocals

Production
Producer: James Talley
Recording Engineer: Richie Cicero/Lee Hazen/Tony Lyons
Photography: Clark Thomas
Liner Notes: Chet Flippo

References

James Talley albums
1975 albums